Stegella is a monotypic genus of hydrozoans belonging to the family Campanulinidae. The only species is Stegella lobata.

The species is found in the coasts of Antarctica.

References

Campanulinidae
Hydrozoan genera
Monotypic cnidarian genera